Regions of Serbia may refer to:
List of regions of Serbia
Statistical regions of Serbia
NUTS statistical regions of Serbia

See also
United Regions of Serbia